The 1930–31 National Football League was the 4th staging of the National Football League, a Gaelic football tournament for the Gaelic Athletic Association county teams of Ireland.

Kerry won their third league in a row. They trailed Cavan 1-1 to 0-1 at half-time in the final, but went on to win by a point. After their win, Kerry went on an American tour.

Format

Divisions
 Division One: 22 teams. Split into four regional groups
 Division Two: 10 teams. Split into two regional sections

Round-robin format
Each team played every other team in its division (or group where the division is split) once, either home or away.

Points awarded
2 points were awarded for a win and 1 for a draw.

Titles
 Teams in Division One competed for the National Football League title.
 Teams in Division Two (Midland) competed for the National Football League Division Two (Midland) title.
 Teams in Division Two (Northern) competed for the National Football League Division Two (Northern) title.

Knockout stage qualifiers
 Division One title: top team in each group qualified for the semi-final
 Division Two (Midland) title: top team in each group qualified for the final
 Division Two (Northern) title: group winners win the title

Division One

Group A

Table

Group B

Table

Group C

Group D

Table

Knockout stage

Semi-finals

Final

Division two

Midland

Northern Section

Southern Section

Final

Tables

Northern Section

Southern Section

Northern

Table

References

National Football League
National Football League
National Football League (Ireland) seasons